"There are unknown unknowns" is a phrase from a response United States Secretary of Defense Donald Rumsfeld gave to a question at a U.S. Department of Defense (DoD) news briefing on February 12, 2002, about the lack of evidence linking the government of Iraq with the supply of weapons of mass destruction to terrorist groups. Rumsfeld stated:

The statement became the subject of much commentary. In The Decision Book, author Mikael Krogerus refers to it as the "Rumsfeld matrix". The statement also features in a 2013 documentary film, The Unknown Known, directed by Errol Morris.

Known unknowns refers to "risks you are aware of, such as canceled flights," whereas unknown unknowns are risks that come from situations that are so unexpected that they would not be considered.

Origins
Rumsfeld's statement brought attention to the concepts of known knowns, known unknowns, and unknown unknowns, but national security and intelligence professionals have long used an analysis technique referred to as the Johari window. The idea of unknown unknowns was created in 1955 by two American psychologists, Joseph Luft and Harrington Ingham in their development of the Johari window. They used it as a technique to help people better understand their relationship with themselves as well as others.

The term was also commonly used inside NASA. Rumsfeld cited NASA administrator William Graham in his memoir; he wrote that he had first heard "a variant of the phrase" from Graham when they served together on the Commission to Assess the Ballistic Missile Threat to the United States during the late 1990s. Kirk Borne, an astrophysicist who was employed as a data scientist at NASA Goddard Space Flight Center at the time, said in an April 2013 TED talk that he had used the phrase "unknown unknowns" in a talk to personnel at the Homeland Security Transition Planning Office a few days prior to Rumsfeld's remarks, and speculated that the term may have percolated up to Rumsfeld and other high-ranking officials in the Defense Department.

The terms "known unknowns" and "unknown unknowns" are often used in project management and strategic planning circles.

Contemporary usage is largely consistent with the earliest known usages. For example, the term was used in evidence given to the British Columbia Royal Commission of Inquiry into Uranium Mining in 1979:

The term also appeared in a 1982 New Yorker article on the aerospace industry, which cites the example of metal fatigue, the cause of crashes in de Havilland Comet airliners in the 1950s.

Reaction

Canadian columnist Mark Steyn called it "in fact a brilliant distillation of quite a complex matter". Australian economist and blogger John Quiggin wrote: "Although the language may be tortured, the basic point is both valid and important."

Psychoanalytic philosopher Slavoj Žižek says that beyond these three categories there is a fourth, the unknown known, that which one intentionally refuses to acknowledge that one knows: "If Rumsfeld thinks that the main dangers in the confrontation with Iraq were the 'unknown unknowns', that is, the threats from Saddam whose nature we cannot even suspect, then the Abu Ghraib scandal shows that the main dangers lie in the "unknown knowns"—the disavowed beliefs, suppositions and obscene practices we pretend not to know about, even though they form the background of our public values."

German sociologists Christopher Daase and Oliver Kessler agreed that the cognitive frame for political practice may be determined by the relationship between "what we know, what we do not know, what we cannot know", but stated that Rumsfeld left out "what we do not like to know".

The event has been used in multiple books to discuss risk assessment.

Rumsfeld named his 2011 autobiography Known and Unknown: A Memoir. In the author's note at the start of the book, he expressly acknowledges the source of his memoir's title and mentions a few examples of his statement's prominence. The Unknown Known is the title of Errol Morris's 2013 biographical documentary film about Rumsfeld. In it, Rumsfield initially defines "unknown knowns" as "the things you think you know, that it turns out you did not", and toward the end of the film he defines the term as "things that you know, that you don't know you know".

Rumsfeld's comment earned the 2003 Foot in Mouth Award from the British Plain English Campaign.

Analytical sciences
The term "known unknowns" has been applied to the identification of chemical substances using analytical chemistry approaches, specifically mass spectrometry. In many cases, an unknown to an investigator that is detected in an experiment is actually known in the chemical literature, a reference database, or an Internet resource. These types of compounds are termed "known unknowns". The term was originally coined by Little et al. and reported a number of times in the literature since then as a general approach.

See also

 Black swan theory
 Dunning–Kruger effect
 Epistemic modal logic
 Four stages of competence
 I know that I know nothing
 Ignoramus et ignorabimus
 Ignotum per ignotius
 Johari window
 Knightian uncertainty
 Known and Unknown: A Memoir
 "Known Unknowns"
 Outside Context Problem
 Russell's teapot
 Undecidable problem
 The Unknown Known
 Wild card (foresight)
 Cynefin framework

References

External links
 
 
 

American phraseology
Epistemology
Political quotes
Unknown content
Ignorance
2002 neologisms
Donald Rumsfeld